4Dwm is the window manager component of the IRIX Interactive Desktop normally used on Silicon Graphics workstations running IRIX. 4Dwm is derived from the older Motif Window Manager and uses the Motif widget toolkit on top of the X Window System found on most Unix systems. 4Dwm on IRIX was one of the first default graphical user interface desktops to be standard on a Unix computer system. 4Dwm refers to "Fourth dimension window manager" and has no relation to dwm.

Other X window managers that mimic the 4Dwm look and feel exist, such as 4Dwm theme for IceWM and 5Dwm which is a clone/compatible implementation of 4Dwm based OpenMotif. 5Dwm support both the classic SGI look and a modern/polished look and feel with anti-aliased fonts and UTF-8 support.

Features 
 A stacking window manager
 Uses the Motif widget library
 Applications can be launched via a menu panel
 Window decorations include borders and a titlebar
 The titlebar provides a meta button and facilities to minimize and maximize windows
 Support for themes

References

External links 
 SGI Graphics FAQ
 4Dwm theme for Fvwm
 Irixium theme for Plasma

X window managers
IRIX software